Adilson Carlos Tavares Filho (born 9 February 1988), known as Adilson Goiano or simply Adilson, is a Brazilian footballer who plays as a midfielder for Grêmio Novorizontino.

Club career
In April 2019, he joined Criciúma.

References

Brazilian footballers
1994 births
Living people
Campeonato Brasileiro Série B players
Primeira Liga players
Indian Super League players
Vila Nova Futebol Clube players
Esporte Clube XV de Novembro (Piracicaba) players
América Futebol Clube (RN) players
Associação Atlética Ponte Preta players
Clube Atlético Bragantino players
F.C. Arouca players
NorthEast United FC players
Grêmio Novorizontino players
Sampaio Corrêa Futebol Clube players
Criciúma Esporte Clube players
Sportspeople from Goiânia
Association football midfielders
21st-century Brazilian people